USS Pinnebog (AOG–58) was a  acquired by the U.S. Navy for the dangerous task of transporting gasoline to warships in the fleet, and to remote Navy stations.

Pinnebog was laid down, 29 December 1944, as a Maritime Commission type (T1-MT-M1) tanker hull, under a Maritime Commission contract, at Cargill, Inc., Savage, Minnesota. She was launched on 12 May 1945 and commissioned Pinnebog (AOG-58), 20 October 1945.

Service as a U.S. Navy gasoline tanker  
After serving with the U.S. Navy for 3½ years as a gasoline tanker, Pinnebog was placed out of commission in reserve 2 May 1949 in the Texas Group, Atlantic Reserve Fleet.

Reactivated, she was assigned to MSTS in March 1952 and operated under contract with a civilian crew until July 1954, when she was again placed in reserve, berthed in Florida. She was transferred to the Maritime Administration 20 April 1956 and to MSTS 23 April 1956.

Loaned to the U.S. Air Force 
She was then operated by an MSTS civil service crew until September 1957, when she was loaned to the U.S. Air Force.

Deactivation 
Pinnebog was struck from the Naval Register (date unknown) and custody was transferred to the Maritime Commission, 15 December 1987. She was scrapped on 18 April 1988.

References

External links 
 http://www.navsource.org/archives/09/20/2058.htm NavSource Online: Service Ship Photo Archive AOG-58 Pinnebog

 

Patapsco-class gasoline tankers
Ships built in Savage, Minnesota
1945 ships
World War II auxiliary ships of the United States